The 1909 Paris–Roubaix was the 14th edition of the Paris–Roubaix, a classic one-day cycle race in France. The single day event was held on 11 April 1909 and stretched  from Paris to its end in a velodrome in Roubaix. The winner was Octave Lapize from France.

Results

References

Paris–Roubaix
Paris-Roubaix
Paris-Roubaix
Paris-Roubaix